Eureka is an unincorporated community in Franklin County, Texas, United States. According to the Handbook of Texas, the community had a population of 18 in 2000.

History
Eureka had a church and one business in the 1930s. There were several scattered houses in 1985. Its population was 18 in 2000. There are two cemeteries near Eureka: Fairview and Pierce's Chapel cemeteries.

Geography
It sits near the Hopkins County line.

Education
In 1896, Eureka had a school with one teacher and 37 students. It remained in the 1930s. Today, the community is served by the Mount Vernon Independent School District.

References

Unincorporated communities in Franklin County, Texas
Unincorporated communities in Texas